Wild rice are four species of grasses forming the genus Zizania, and the grain that can be harvested from them.

Wild rice may also refer to:

 Oryza barthii, a grass native to sub-Saharan Africa
 Oryza rufipogon, red rice or wild rice, an invasive species and also a precious resource for breeding crop rice
 Porteresia coarctata, a species of grass native to south Asia
Wild rice may also refer to organisations with the phrase in their names:

 W!LD RICE, a Singaporean theatre company

See also
 Red rice (disambiguation)
 Wild Rice River (disambiguation), two rivers in the United States